Caulerpa scalpelliformis is a species of seaweed in the Caulerpaceae family.

In Western Australia, it is found along the coast in the Mid West region and along much of the southern coastline. The range extends to Tasmania and as far as New South Wales around Jervis Bay.

References

scalpelliformis
Species described in 1820